Antsla Airfield is a private airfield in Antsla, Võru County, Estonia.

The airfield is covered with grass. The airfield's owner is Virge Ventsel.

References

Airports in Estonia
Buildings and structures in Võru County
Antsla Parish